Roope Kakko (born 13 February 1982) is a Finnish professional golfer.

Kakko was born in Espoo, Finland. He started playing golf at the age of five.

In 2004, Kakko became only the third amateur to win a tournament on the Challenge Tour, when he won his home event, the Volvo Finnish Open. The win earned him a Tour card for the following season, and having turned professional later in 2004, he joined the Challenge Tour full-time. He was a regular on the tour for the next five seasons, although he did not win again, with a best finish on the money list of 27th in 2008, when he was twice a runner-up. His strong 2008 season gained Kakko entry into a small number of European Tour events, and he capitalised on those opportunities by making successive top-10 finishes at the 2009 BMW Italian Open and 3 Irish Open. Despite these successes, his limited playing opportunities meant Kakko returned to the Challenge Tour full-time in 2010, but at the end of that season he came through the Qualifying School to secure full membership of the European Tour for the first time. In October 2013, Kakko would win at the National Bank of Oman Golf Classic on the Challenge Tour.

Personal life
Kakko's wife is the LPGA Tour golfer Minea Blomqvist; they have one child. He is friends with American band Avenged Sevenfold.

Professional wins (7)

European Tour wins (1)

1Dual-ranking event with the Challenge Tour

Challenge Tour wins (3)

*Note: The 2004 Volvo Finnish Open was shortened to 54 holes due to rain.
1Dual-ranking event with the European Tour

Challenge Tour playoff record (1–1)

Nordic Golf League wins (3)

Finnish Tour wins (3)

Team appearances
Amateur
European Youths' Team Championship (representing Finland): 2002
European Amateur Team Championship (representing Finland): 2003

Professional
World Cup (representing Finland): 2008, 2013

See also
2010 European Tour Qualifying School graduates
2013 Challenge Tour graduates

References

External links

Finnish male golfers
European Tour golfers
Olympic golfers of Finland
Golfers at the 2016 Summer Olympics
Sportspeople from Espoo
1982 births
Living people
21st-century Finnish people